is a 2008 Japanese film directed by Yūzō Asahara.

References

2008 films
Films directed by Yūzou Asahara
2000s Japanese-language films
19
Films set in Ōita Prefecture
2000s Japanese films